Iljaz Çeço (born 3 January 1947) is an Albanian retired football player and club director.

Club career
The midfielder made his senior debut for Traktori Lushnja on 13 January 1962 against Korabi, aged only 15 and spent the rest of his playing career at Dinamo Tirana, except for one season at 17 Nëntori Tirana.

International career
Çeço is the youngest footballer to ever play for Albania's national team. At only 17, he was launched by Zyber Konçi in a friendly against Algeria on October 11, 1964, finished in a 1-1 draw. He earned a total of 8 caps, scoring no goals. His final international was a November 1971 European Championship qualification match against Turkey.

Honours
Albanian Superliga: 5
 1967, 1973, 1975, 1976, 1977

Albanian Cup: 3
 1971, 1974, 1978

Personal life
Çeço is married and has two children. He was a lawyer by profession. He also was chairman of Dinamo from 1981 to 1987.

References

External links

 Iljaz Çeço: Stema është e jona, ekipin e Dinamos duhet ta ringrejmë nga e para (bio) - Panorama 

1947 births
Living people
Sportspeople from Lushnjë
Association football midfielders
Albanian footballers
Albania international footballers
KS Lushnja players
FK Dinamo Tirana players
KF Tirana players
Kategoria Superiore players